Prince Nabhanka Nibandhabongs or Phra Chao Boromwongse Ther Phra Ong Chao Nabhanka Nibandhabongs (RTGS: Naphang Niphathaphong) (8 August 1874 – 17 September 1876), was the Prince of Siam (later Thailand). He was a member of  the Siamese Royal Family. He was a son of Chulalongkorn, King Rama V of Siam.

His mother was Saeng Galyanamitra (daughter of Phraya Jayavichit, son of Chao Phraya Nikara Bodindra (Toh) who built Galyanamitra Temple). Prince Nabhanka Nibandhabongs had one elder brother and two younger sisters;
 Prince Isaravongs Vorarajakumara (4 September 1870 – 5 June 1872)
 Princess Beatrice Bhadrayuvadi (5 December 1876 – 30 September 1913)
 Princess Charoensri Chanamayu (31 March 1878 – 24 December 1916)

Prince Nabhanka Nibandhabongs died on 17 September 1876, at the age of only 2.

Ancestry

1874 births
1876 deaths
19th-century Thai royalty who died as children
19th-century Chakri dynasty
Thai male Phra Ong Chao
Children of Chulalongkorn
Sons of kings